Sapp Rocks are two exposed rocks lying 2 nautical miles (3.7 km) north of Alley Spur along the north side of Dufek Massif, Pensacola Mountains. Mapped by United States Geological Survey (USGS) from surveys and U.S. Navy air photos, 1956–66. Named by Advisory Committee on Antarctic Names (US-ACAN) for Cliflton E. Sapp, hospital corpsman with the South Pole winter party, 1965.

 
Rock formations of Queen Elizabeth Land